Dicyrtomina is a genus of globular springtails in the family Dicyrtomidae. There are about five described species in Dicyrtomina.

Species
These five species belong to the genus Dicyrtomina:
 Dicyrtomina flavosignata (Tullberg, 1871) g
 Dicyrtomina minuta (Fabricius, 1783) i c g b
 Dicyrtomina ornata (Nicolet, 1842) g
 Dicyrtomina saundersi (Lubbock, 1862) g
 Dicyrtomina violacea (Krausbauer, 1898) g
Data sources: i = ITIS, c = Catalogue of Life, g = GBIF, b = Bugguide.net

References

Further reading

External links

 

Collembola
Articles created by Qbugbot
Springtail genera